Ferdinando Acton (16 July 1832, Naples – 18 February 1891, Rome) was an Italian naval officer, admiral, politician and Minister for the Navy. 

He was descended from a noble family which had originated in England before moving to Tuscany then the Kingdom of the Two Sicilies - he served in the Real Marina of the latter, then in Regia Marina of the unified Kingdom of Italy.

His grandfather was General Joseph Edward Acton (1737-1830), brother of Sir John Acton, 6th Baronet, commander of the naval forces of Grand Duchy of Tuscany and prime minister of Naples. His elder brother was Guglielmo Acton and his son was Alfredo Acton, also Minister for the Navy. His sister Laura remarried in 1864 with Marco Minghetti, then prime minister of Italy.

References 

1832 births
1891 deaths
19th-century Neapolitan people
Italian people of English descent
Naval officers of the Kingdom of the Two Sicilies
Recipients of the Order of the Netherlands Lion
Italian admirals